Beemster is a former municipality in the Netherlands, in the province of North Holland. The Beemster is the first so-called polder in the Netherlands that was reclaimed from a lake, the water being extracted from the lake by windmills. The Beemster polder was drained between 1609 and 1612. It has preserved intact its well-ordered landscape of fields, roads, canals, dykes and settlements, laid out in accordance with classical and Renaissance planning principles. A grid of canals parallels the grid of roads in the Beemster. The grids are offset: the larger feeder canals are offset by approximately one kilometer from the larger roads.

Beemster merged into the existing municipality of Purmerend on 1 January 2022.

Population centres 

The former municipality of Beemster consisted of the following cities, towns, villages and/or districts:

Topography

Map of the former municipality of Beemster, 2015.

History 
Around 800 AD the area of the modern municipality of Beemster was covered in peat. The name "Beemster" has been derived from "Bamestra" (see Groenedijk, 2000), the name of a small river in the area. In the period 1150-1250 peat-digging by people, and storm floods, enlarged that small river into an inland sea, a lake in open connection with the Zuiderzee. Around 1605 private investors started to drain the Beemster lake. In 1610, this was almost complete, but the lake re-filled because of a break in the Zuiderzee dikes. It was decided to make the ring-dike a meter high above the surrounding country. In 1612 the polder was dry and the land was divided among the investors. In the earlier days of the polder, farmers occupied its lands for growing the crops necessary for long sea journeys by the VOC to the East Indies. It turned out that the farmland was so good that the project was considered then to be an economic success, in contrast to e.g. the Heerhugowaard. Since 1999 the entire Beemster polder has been on the UNESCO world heritage list.

The Beemster polder is home to CONO Kaasmakers, maker of the Beemster brand of cheeses.  This co-op was formed in 1901 to create cheese made from milk that comes from the Beemster polder.  Today Beemster Cheese is sold in Europe, as well as the U.S., Canada, Japan, and China.

World Heritage Site
Because of its historical relevance, and because the original structure of the area is still largely intact, the Beemster was inscribed on the UNESCO World Heritage Site list in 1999. Justification for Inscription is as follows:
Criterion (i): The Beemster Polder is a masterpiece of creative planning, in which the ideals of antiquity and the Renaissance were applied to the design of a reclaimed landscape.
Criterion (ii): The innovative and intellectually imaginative landscape of the Beemster Polder had a profound and lasting impact on reclamation projects in Europe and beyond.
Criterion (iv): The creation of the Beemster Polder marks a major step forward in the interrelationship between humankind and water at a crucial period of social and economic expansion.

In addition in the Beemster Polder there are five fortresses as part of the Stelling van Amsterdam, another UNESCO World Heritage Site. The Beemster Polder combines two UNESCO World Heritage Sites.

Local government 
The municipal council of Beemster consisted of 13 seats, which were divided as follows since 2014:

Last mayor was Joyce van Beek (CDA).

Notable people 

 Carel Fabritius (1622 in Middenbeemster – 1654) a Dutch painter
 Barent Fabritius (1624 in Middenbeemster - 1673) a Dutch painter 
 Johannes Fabritius (1636 – ca.1693) a Dutch Golden Age painter
 The Reverend Nanne Zwiep (1894 in Beemster – 1942 in Dachau) a pastor of the Dutch Reformed Church
 Harry Droog (born 1944) a retired Dutch rower, competed at the 1968 Summer Olympics
 Erik Postma (1953 - 2002 in Middenbeemster) was a Dutch politician, Mayor of Beemster from 1998

See also
Museum Betje Wolff

Gallery

References

Footnotes

Bibliography
Van de Ven, G. (redactie) (1996). "Leefbaar laagland" (4th, revised reprint). Uitgeverij Matrijs. p. 33-35, 55 en 131-136. 
Groenedijk, T. (2000). "Nederlandse plaatsnamen". Slingenberg Boekproducties, Hoogeveen, Netherlands 2000.

External links

Official website

Former municipalities of North Holland
Polders of North Holland
World Heritage Sites in the Netherlands
Former lakes of the Netherlands
1612 establishments in the Dutch Republic
Municipalities of the Netherlands disestablished in 2022